The Retezat Mountains are one of the highest massifs in Romania, being part of the Southern Carpathians. Other important peaks are Păpușa (Vârful Păpușa, "the Doll Peak") and Retezat Peak (Vârful Retezat). The name means "cut off" in Romanian.

Geography
The area also contains the Retezat National Park, Romania's first national park.

River systems and lakes
The tectonic, lithologic and morphologic conditions present in the Retezat Mountains, correlated with the orientation of the ridges towards the main air masses make this mountain group the most humid area in the Romanian Carpathians.
The hydrologic network is divided into two main directions: north, towards the river Strei (the Mureș drainage basin) where all the rivers from the west, north, and north-east areas of the massif are flowing and south, towards the river Jiul de Vest (the Jiu drainage basin). Waterfalls are present on all water courses in the park.

One of the specific features of the Retezat Mountains is the widespread presence of glacial lakes. Approximately 38% of the glacier lakes of Romania are found here, on the bottom of calderas, grouped in lake clusters or isolated, and are one of the biggest tourist attraction of the park. Some sources mention over 80 lakes, but here are most likely included the temporary ones as well.

Flora
Of the approximately 3,500 plant species that are found in Romania, over a third (about 1,200) can be found here. This is mainly the reason why this area was declared a National park. There are over 90 plant species that are endemic to this area, the first one being discovered in 1858: Flămânzica (Draba dorneri).

The alpine meadows are particularly important, as here are found most of the alpine species, such as members of the genera Gentiana, Potentilla and Pulsatilla. The edelweiss can also be found here. At the limits between the rocky area and the alpine fields, species of rhododendron (Rhododendron kotschii) can be found. The mountain pine, a protected species in Romania, can be found on all the steep slopes of the Retezat mountains, while the Swiss pine (Pinus cembra) has a wider distribution than in any other Romanian massif.

Other species that can be found here are: hawkweed (Hieracium borzae and Hieracium nigrilacus), members of the genus Centaurea (Centaurea pseudophrygia ratezatensis, an endemic species), cat's ear (Hypochaeris maculata), an endemic species of locoweed (Oxytropis jacquinii retezatensis) and Gentiana lutea (ro. Ghinţura galbenă).

The biggest threat for the park's flora (especially the one found on the alpine fields), is overgrazing, as there are numerous herds of sheep. The species specific to this area are replaced by less fragile ones.

Fauna

Over 185 species of birds, more than half of the species that can be found in Romania, visit the park. Out of these, over 122 species nest here. Rare birds, such as the golden eagle, (also represented on the park logo), lesser spotted eagle, short-toed eagle, peregrine falcon, western capercaillie, Eurasian eagle-owl, Eurasian pygmy-owl and the black stork reside here.

There are 55 species of mammals within the park range. There are favorable conditions here for some of Europe's biggest predators to survive: the gray wolf, brown bear and the Eurasian lynx; some big herbivores like the chamois, red deer and the roe deer, while small carnivores such as the wildcat and the European otter can also be found.

In 1973, 20 alpine marmots, brought from the Austrian Alps, were introduced in the park and released in the Gemenele glacier lake caldera. Nowadays they are found all over the park, but the impact that this nonindigenous species had on other plants or animals is yet unknown. Also, after 1960, the brown trout was introduced in some of the park lakes. Studies are now being performed to check if they are responsible for the decline in amphibian population through these lakes, observed during the last years.

A subspecies of the smooth newt (L. vulgaris ampelensis), endemic to the Charpatian mountains, lives here, while the European common frog can be found all over the park. Although very few common European viper bites were reported, tourists and villagers often kill them on sight. There are several endemic invertebrate species found here: nine endemic species of butterflies, at least six species belonging to the Plecoptera order, and four belonging to the Trichoptera order.

Access

South Retezat Region 
The southern approaches to the Retezat extend from the Jiu Valley city of Vulcan on the east end of the valley to Câmpușel on the west end of the valley.

North Retezat Region
The Retezat Mountains and the Retezat National Park are accessible from the north by way of Romania's Route 66 (DN-66) and/or by way of train, which runs alongside Route 66, from Petroșani to the southeast or Simeria to the north. From Route 66, there are several gateways into the Retezat Mountains. Almost all the villages along the highway, from Ohaba de sub Piatră, just outside Hațeg, to Merișor, just outside Petroșani, have access roads that run south into the Retezat Mountains.

Highest peaks
The Retezat massif peaks with an elevation of over 2,300m are: 

Peleaga 2,509 m
Păpușa 2,508 m
Retezat 2,482 m
Mare 2,463 m
Custura 2,457 m
Bucura 2,433 m
Sântămaria 2,400 m
Judele 2,398 m 
Bucura II 2,372 m 
Țapu 2,372 m
Custura Bucurei 2,370 m
Păpușa Mică 2,370 m
Bârlea 2,348 m
Slăveiu 2,347 m
Obârșia Nucșoarei 2,346 m
Morii 2,340 m
Ciumfu Mare 2,335 m
Șesele Mari 2,324 m
Valea Rea 2,311 m

Image gallery

External links

Official website of Retezat National Park
Retezat page on SummitPost
Online climbing guide for Retezat Mountains
Alpinet
Maps of the Retezat
Jiu Valley Portal - Romania's principal coalmining region and a gateway to the Retezat National Park
Retezat - photographs + information in Czech

Mountain ranges of Romania
Mountain ranges of the Southern Carpathians